Forever... Greatest Hits is the second greatest hits compilation released by British boy band Take That. The album is a mixture of hits taken from their first three studio albums, as well as a selection of B-sides and remixes, some of which have never before been released. The album includes a total of thirty-four tracks.

Track listings

Personnel
Gary Barlow – vocals
Howard Donald – vocals
Jason Orange – vocals
Mark Owen – vocals
Robbie Williams – vocals

References

Take That albums
2002 greatest hits albums
RCA Records compilation albums